Children of the Night is a 1991 American horror film directed by Tony Randel, and starring Karen Black, Peter DeLuise, and Ami Dolenz. Its plot follows a young woman and a local schoolteacher who attempt to rid their small community of vampires that have been inadvertently unleashed.

Plot
Before going away to college, two childhood friends, Cindy Thompson and Lucy Barrett, decide to symbolically cleanse themselves of the "dirt" of their small town by swimming laps in a flooded, abandoned church crypt.  Lucy drops her crucifix, which drifts down onto the submerged remains of an ancient vampire, Czakyr. Czakyr awakes and kills Cindy.

Mark Gardner (Peter DeLuise), a school teacher from a nearby town, gets directed to Allburg by an old friend of his, Father Frank Aldin (Evan Mackenzie). Once there he tries to help Lucy, as she has now become the target of a town-turned-vampires, due to her "virgin blood". Lucy, Mark, and a drunken preacher make camp in an abandoned building outside of town and make plans to fight the vampire army. Utilizing the preacher's "cross mobile" they battle Allburg's entire vampire populace, ultimately taking on the evil Czakyr. Once Czakyr has been killed, the town's folk return to normal, with some complaining of "splinters in their chests".

Cast

Release and reception
Children of the Night had its world premiere at the 1991 Toronto International Film Festival as part of their Midnight Madness program. Jay Scott (The Globe and Mail) referred to the film as a standout of the program, referring to the film as "a truly disgusting vampire film - imagine Karen Black in latex makeup, moaning through her rubber fangs".

References

Further reading
 Jackson, Anna, Karen Coats, and Roderick McGillis. The Gothic in Children's Literature: Haunting the Borders. New York: Routledge. 2008. Print.
 Kendrick, Charmette. "Horror in Children's Literature from the Nineteenth Century." The Goblins Will Get You! Volume 1. 2009:19-23.Academic Search Complete. Web. 15 February 2011.
 Wilkens, Katharina. "Mary and the Demons: Marian Devotion and Ritual Healing in Tanzania." Journal of Religion in Africa 39.2009: 295-318.Religion and Philosophy Collection.Web. 15 February 2011.
 "Review-Children of the Night." Fearscene. XOOPS, 6/15/2005. Web. 15 February 2011.

External links 
 
 
 

American supernatural horror films
1991 films
Columbia Pictures films
American vampire films
1991 horror films
Films directed by Tony Randel
American exploitation films
Films scored by Daniel Licht
American splatter films
1990s English-language films
1990s American films